Racketeering is a type of organized crime in which the perpetrators set up a coercive, fraudulent, extortionary, or otherwise illegal coordinated scheme or operation (a "racket") to repeatedly or consistently collect a profit.

Originally and often still specifically, racketeering may refer to an organized criminal act in which the perpetrators offer a service that will not be put into effect, offer a service to solve a nonexistent problem, or offer a service that solves a problem that would not exist without the racket. However, racketeers may offer an ostensibly effectual service to solve an existing problem. The traditional and historically most common example of such a racket is the "protection racket", in which racketeers offer to protect a business from robbery or vandalism; however, the racketeers will themselves coerce or threaten the business into accepting this service, often with the threat (implicit or otherwise) that failure to acquire the offered services will lead to the racketeers themselves contributing to the existing problem. In many cases, the potential problem may be caused by the same party that offers to solve it, but that fact may be concealed, with the intent to engender continual patronage. The protection racket is thus often a method of extortion, at least in practice.

However, the term "racket" has expanded in definition over time and may now be used less strictly to refer to any continuous or repeated illegal organized crime operation, including those that do not necessarily involve fraudulent or coercive practices or extortion. For example, "racket" may refer to the "numbers racket" or the "drug racket", neither of which generally or necessarily involve extortion, coercion, fraud, or deception with regard to the intended clientele. Because of the clandestine nature of the black market, most proceeds made from criminal rackets often go untaxed.

The term "racketeering" was coined by the Employers' Association of Chicago in June 1927 in a statement about the influence of organized crime in the Teamsters Union.  Specifically, a racket was defined by this coinage as being a service that calls forth its own demand, and would not have been needed otherwise.

Examples 
Examples of crimes that may be alleged to be part of a pattern of racketeering activity include

 A protection racket is a form of extortion whereby racketeers offer to "protect" property from damage in exchange for a fee, while also threatening (possibly in a veiled way), in part or in whole, to execute the kind of damage they claim to be offering protection against.
 A fencing racket is an operation specializing in the resale of stolen goods.
 A numbers racket is any unauthorized lottery or illegal gambling operation.
 Money laundering and other creative accounting practices that are misused in ways to disguise sources of illegal funds.
 Organized, coordinated, and repeated or regular theft operations, including: pickpocketing, burglary, smash and grab, home invasion, gasoline theft, metal theft, train robbery, armed robbery, bank robbery and art theft
 Organized retail crime and shoplifting
 Fraud and embezzlement operations, including: credit card fraud, check fraud, health care fraud, welfare fraud, insurance fraud, employment fraud, lottery fraud, disability fraud, charity fraud, mail and wire fraud, securities fraud, bank fraud, mortgage fraud, telemarketing fraud, return fraud, false billing and electoral fraud
 Confidence tricks, including: romance scams, larceny, overpayment scams and advance-fee scams
 Mail robbery and package theft rings
 Truck theft, auto theft and chop shop operations
 Counterfeit operations, including: Counterfeit consumer goods such as counterfeit medications, counterfeit electronic components, counterfeit watches, copyright infringement, art forgery and identity document forgery
 Illegal taxicab operations
 Identity theft and sale of personal data
 Kidnapping and ransom rings
 Contract killing or murder-for-hire services
 White-collar financial crime operations, including: front running, market manipulation, and insider trading
 Bribery and police corruption
 Organized academic dishonesty by school administrators, essay mills, contract cheating, diploma mills
 Loan sharking rackets
 Computer crimes
 Drug trafficking operations, including: depressants, opioids, stimulants, entactogens, hallucinogens, designer drugs, performance-enhancing substances and unlicensed pharmaceuticals
 Arms trafficking operations, including: gun-running, knife-running and sale of explosives
 Extortion rackets
 Blackmail operations
 Counterfeit money and counterfeit coin operations
 Organized prostitution operations, including: procuring, sex work, sexual tourism, and commercial sexual exploitation of children
 Cigarette smuggling rackets
 Organized witness tampering and intimidation
 Modern piracy rackets
 Business skimming operations
 Illicit gems and blood diamond operations
 Illegal gambling, bookmaking, and match fixing
 Human trafficking rings, including: trafficking of children, sex trafficking, labor trafficking, bride buying and debt bondage
 People smuggling rings
 Antiquities trade operations
 Organ trafficking rings
 Rum-running rackets (or alcohol smuggling), caffeinated alcoholic drink operations, illegal sale of alcohol to minors, and moonshine operations
 Illegal nuclear power trade operations
 Illegal subleasing rackets
 Criminal operation of otherwise ostensibly legal operations, such as strip clubs, hotels, restaurants, casinos, nightclubs, bars, pornographic film studios, social clubs, construction companies, salvage yards, auto shops, laundromats, dry cleaners, waste management firms, farms, property development companies, hospitals, television studios, newsrooms, clinics, music stores, hardware stores, fisheries, airline companies, shipyards, florist shops and fashion companies
 Political corruption
 Corporate corruption
 Bid rigging and price fixing
 Labor corruption or labor racketeering
 No-show jobs
 Backyard breeding operations of animals such as working dogs, working cats, livestock and other kinds of domesticated animals as well as exotic pets
 Illegal sports, including underground fight clubs, street racing and baiting
 Poaching and overfishing
 Illegal logging, illegal construction, and illegal mining
 Blood sports such as dog fighting, organized horse fighting, betta-fighting, ram fighting, cockfighting, and bullfighting

RICO Act

On October 15, 1970, the Racketeer Influenced and Corrupt Organizations Act (18 U.S.C. §§ 1961–1968), commonly referred to as the "RICO Act", became United States law. The RICO Act allowed law enforcement to charge a person or group of people with racketeering, defined as committing multiple violations of certain varieties within a ten-year period. The purpose of the RICO Act was stated as "the elimination of the infiltration of organized crime and racketeering into legitimate organizations operating in interstate commerce". S.Rep. No. 617, 91st Cong., 1st Sess. 76 (1968). However, the statute is sufficiently broad to encompass illegal activities relating to any enterprise affecting interstate or foreign commerce.

Section 1961(10) of Title 18 provides that the Attorney General of the United States may designate any department or agency to conduct investigations authorized by the RICO statute and such department or agency may use the investigative provisions of the statute or the investigative power of such department or agency otherwise conferred by law. Absent a specific designation by the Attorney General, jurisdiction to conduct investigations for violations of 18 U.S.C. § 1962 lies with the agency having jurisdiction over the violations constituting the pattern of racketeering activity listed in 18 U.S.C. § 1961.

In the US, civil racketeering laws are also used in federal and state courts.

See also
 Addiopizzo
 Confidence trick
 Pizzo (extortion)

References

External links
"Organized Crime." Oxford Bibliographies Online: Criminology.

Crimes
Organized crime
Organized crime activity
Organized crime terminology